The Cleveland Guardians are a Major League Baseball (MLB) franchise based in Cleveland, Ohio; until 2021, they were known as the Cleveland Indians.  They play in the American League Central division. The first game of the new baseball season is played on Opening Day, and being named the starter that day is an honor, which is often given to the player who is expected to lead the pitching staff that season, though there are various strategic reasons why a team's best pitcher might not start on Opening Day. Since joining the league in 1901, the Indians have used 58 different Opening Day starting pitchers which includes the Opening Day starting pitchers from the Bluebirds and the Naps. They have a record of 58 wins and 54 losses in their Opening Day games.

The Indians have played in three different home ball parks, League Park from 1901 through 1946, Cleveland Stadium from 1932 to 1993, and Progressive Field since 1994.  From 1934 through 1946 some games were played at League Park and some at Cleveland Stadium. They had a record of 11 wins and 4 losses in Opening Day games at League Park, 9 wins and 13 losses at Cleveland Stadium and 2 wins and 4 losses at Progressive Field, for a total home record in Opening Day games of 22 wins and 21 losses.  Their record in Opening Day away games is 35 wins and 35 losses.

Bob Feller has the most Opening Day starts for the Indians, with seven.  Stan Coveleski had six Opening Day starts for the Indians, Bob Lemon and CC Sabathia each had five Opening Day starts, and Addie Joss, Willie Mitchell, Gaylord Perry and Charles Nagy each had four. Several Baseball Hall of Famers have made Opening Day starts for the Indians, including Feller, Coveleski, Lemon, Joss, Gaylord Perry, Dennis Eckersley and Early Wynn. Brothers Jim Perry and Gaylord Perry each made Opening Day starts for the Indians. Jim Perry started on Opening Day in 1961 and Gaylord Perry made Opening Day starts in 1972, 1973, 1974 and 1975.

The Indians have played in the World Series six times. They won in 1920 and 1948, and lost in 1954, 1995, 1997, and 2016.  Coveleski was the Opening Day starting pitcher in 1920, Feller in 1948, Wynn in 1954, Dennis Martínez in 1995, Nagy in 1997, and Corey Kluber in 2016.  The Indians are five and one in Opening Day games in those seasons, with the only loss coming in 2016. The Indians and the Toronto Blue Jays currently hold the record for the longest Opening Day game in Major League history. They set that record on Opening Day 2012, when the game lasted 16 innings. This broke the previous record of 15 innings between the Indians and the Detroit Tigers in 1960.

Key

Pitchers

References
General

Specific

Opening day starters
Cleveland Indians